Naïve Records is a French independent record label based in Paris, specializing in electronic music, pop music, jazz and classical music.

Founding and expansion
It was founded in 1998 by Patrick Zelnik, former CEO of Virgin France, Gilles Paires and Eric Tong Cuong.

Following finance house Édouard Stern taking a 10% stake in Naïve, Naïve acquired various other record labels, including among classical labels Auvidis (which included early music label Michel Bernstein's Astrée and modernist label Montaigne), Yolanta Skura's Opus 111 (founded 1990, named after Beethoven's Piano Sonata, Op. 111) and Nicolas Bartholomée's Ambroisie.

Acquisition by Believe
The label got into difficulties after 2010 and, after having operations suspended, was acquired by Denis Ladegaillerie's digital download platform Believe Digital in August 2016. After a long hiatus the label began issuing CDs again with new releases in the Naive Vivaldi Edition.

Artists

 Aṣa
 Asian Dub Foundation
 Benjamin Biolay
 Perry Blake
 Carla Bruni-Sarkozy
 Yilian Cañizares
 John & Jehn
 Jude
 Julien Lourau
 Souad Massi
 M83
 Mirwais
 Moriarty
 Meshell Ndegeocello
 Nervous Cabaret
 Pink Martini
 Serafin
 Tanita Tikaram

Classical and jazz

 Alison Chesley
 Franco Fagioli
 Sergey Khachatryan
 Garth Knox
 Marie-Nicole Lemieux
 Nikolai Lugansky
 Anne Sofie von Otter
 Lise de la Salle
 Federico Maria Sardelli, Vivaldi Edition
 Fazıl Say
 Anthony Strong

References

External links
 Naïve Records at Discogs
 

Record labels established in 1997
French independent record labels
Classical music record labels
Jazz record labels
French companies established in 1997
Companies based in Paris